Daniel Hoyo-Kowalski (born 12 July 2003) is a professional footballer who plays as a centre-back for III liga side Wieczysta Kraków, on loan from Wisła Kraków. Born in Spain, Hoyo-Kowalski represents Poland internationally. Now, he is playing in Wieczysta Kraków

International career
Hoyo-Kowalski was born in Spain to a Spanish father and Polish mother. He moved to Poland in 2010 with his mother after his parents separated. He is a youth international for Poland, and he scored 1 goal for Poland U19 representation. Played in Wisła Kraków, Hutnik Kraków and Wieczysta Kraków.

References

Living people
2003 births
Footballers from Barcelona
Polish footballers
Poland youth international footballers
Spanish footballers
Citizens of Poland through descent
Polish people of Spanish descent
Spanish people of Polish descent
Association football defenders
Wisła Kraków players
Hutnik Nowa Huta players
Ekstraklasa players
II liga players